Two ships of the Royal Navy have been named HMS Grimsby :

  was a  sloop commissioned in 1934 and sunk in 1941
  is a  commissioned in 1999

References

Royal Navy ship names